Canonia is an extinct genus of jawless fish found in Canada. There are two species in this genus, C. grossi and C. costulata.

See also 
 List of prehistoric jawless fish genera
 List of thelodont genera

References

External links 
 

Thelodonti genera
Devonian jawless fish
Extinct animals of Canada